Four Boxes is a play by Bahram Beyzai, written in 1967.

In English and other languages
There are at least three different English translations of this play. M.R. Ghanoonparvar's is titled "Four Boxes" and appears in Iranian Drama: An Anthology (1989). There are also Armenian and Kurdish translations that have been published.

References
 Ghanoonparvar, M. R. "Drama." in Encyclopædia Iranica. Vol. VII, Fasc. 5, pp. 529–535.
 زاهدی, فریندخت (2010). درام معاصر ایرانی و هنریک ایبسن: دریافت و تأثیر. تهران: انتشارات دانشگاه تهران. ISBN 978-964-03-6115-3.
 صابری, پری (2018). «دلبسته این خاکم». اعتماد. 4082.

External links
 

1967 plays
Art works that caused riots
Plays by Bahram Beyzai
Symbolist plays